Radim Uzel (27 March 1940 – 2 May 2022) was a Czech sexologist and director of the Society for Family Planning and Sexual Education (Společnost pro plánování rodiny a sexuální výchovu). He was also an unsuccessful candidate to the Senate of the Czech Republic.

Biography
Uzel was born in Ostrava. In 1957, following his graduation at the gymnasium in Orlová, he studied at the medical faculty of  Masaryk University in Brno.

Uzel died in Prague on 2 May 2022, aged 82. He had been battling stomach cancer.

See also
2003 Zostane to medzi nami

References

1940 births
2022 deaths
Czech sexologists
Czech gynaecologists
Masaryk University alumni
Communist Party of Czechoslovakia politicians
Recipients of Medal of Merit (Czech Republic)
People from Ostrava
Deaths from cancer in the Czech Republic
Deaths from stomach cancer